The Kothapalli–Manoharabad line is a single-track broad-gauge railway line under construction, in the Indian state of Telangana.

The foundation stone was laid on 8 August 2016 by Prime Minister Narendra Modi. Once completed, it will connect Manoharabad to Kothapally in the South Central Railway zone. It reduces the distance from Karimnagar to Hyderabad and provides railway connectivity to many districts in between such as Gajwel, Siddipet, Sircilla.

History 
In 2020, track on this line was tested up until Gajwel. After delays due to COVID-19 the track was laid up until Kodakondla and is fully tested as of January 2023 with the remaining work to be completed by 2025.

On 29 June 2022, the railway line from Manoharabad to Kothapalli received its first shipment of goods at the Gajwel stop. 

In 2023, Rs 185 crores were allocated to the project in the Union Budget.  This is estimated to be sufficient to bring the completion of the line up to Sircilla

On 8 March 2023, the new track work is ongoing around Siddipet. The water authority announced that due to the new line work, water will be shut off in parts of Hyderabad for 48 hours that rely on Godavari Water Supply line while it is being redirected around the Kuknorpally area to allow for the new track.

Stations 
Manoharabad (MOB)
Nacharam (NCRM)
Iranagaram (IRNGR)
Gajwel (GJWL)
Kodakandla (KDKLA)
Lakhadaram (LKDRM)
Duddeda (DUDDA)
Siddipet (SDDPT)
Gurralagondi (GRLND)
Chinnalingapur (CHLNG)
Sircilla (SRCLA)
Vemulawada (VMLWD)
Boinpalli (BNPLI)
Wedira (WEDRA)
Kothapalli(haveli) (KPHI)

Passenger trains 
To be decided, likely DEMU train service to and fro

References 

Rail transport in Telangana
5 ft 6 in gauge railways in India

External links 
 Manoharabad-Kothapalli Project

5 ft 6 in gauge railways in India
Rail transport in Telangana